Nanahimik ang Gabi (A Silent Night) is a 2022 Philippine erotic suspense thriller film starring Ian Veneracion, Heaven Peralejo, and Mon Confiado. It was directed by Shugo Praico under Rein Entertainment.

Cast
Ian Veneracion as Chief: A corrupt and abusive police officer who plays a role of "sugar daddy" in his relationship to Me-Ann. Venaracion find Chief to be very different than himself personality-wise.
Heaven Peralejo as Me-Ann: The "sugar baby" of Chief. Peralejo was offered the role three to four times. She initially hesitated to accept the role due to feeling unready to fulfill some scenes for the film. She described Me-Ann as being different than herself, an independent woman who is a provider for her family. Me-Ann on the other hand is happily willing to rely on Chief despite his abusive behavior since she ultimately benefits from their relationship.
Mon Confiado: Plays the antagonist of the film. Confiado devised method acting in preparation for his role of a character capable of killing. He isolated himself in the mountains for four days for his role since the film is set in a secluded house. Director Praico described the casting for Confiado's role as "tricky" with around 15 actors were considered to portray the character.

Production
Nanahimik ang Gabi was produced under Rein Entertainment with Shugo Praico as its director and writer.  It is a suspense thriller film which has both sexual and violent content. The film revolves around the covert relationship of a woman with a corrupt police officer and "sugar daddy." Principal photography began in July 2022 in Tagaytay.

Release
Nanahimik ang Gabi was released on cinemas in the Philippines on December 25, 2022 as one of the eight official entries of the 2022 Metro Manila Film Festival.

References

Philippine thriller films